Spaces may refer to:

 Google Spaces (app), a cross-platform application for group messaging and sharing
 Windows Live Spaces, the next generation of MSN Spaces
 Spaces (software), a virtual desktop manager implemented in Mac OS X Leopard
 Spaces (social network), a Russian social network for mobile phones
 Gaps, a solitaire card game
 Spaces: The Architecture of Paul Rudolph, a 1983 documentary film
 IWG plc, parent company of the Spaces coworking office workspace chain
 Twitter Spaces, a social audio feature in Twitter

Music
 Spaces (Larry Coryell album), 1970 
 Spaces (Nils Frahm album), 2013
 Spaces (Violeta de Outono album), 2016

See also
Space (disambiguation)